Amorbimorpha mackayiana is a species of moth   of the family Tortricidae. It is found in the United States in western Texas and possibly northern Mexico.

The length of the forewings is 9.7–12.8 mm for males and 11.8–13.4 mm for females. The ground color of the forewings is brownish orange. The hindwings are shining ivory white, gradually yellowing toward the distal regions. Adults have been recorded on wing from late March to early June and again in mid-September, probably in two or more generations per year.

Etymology
The species is names in honor of Margaret MacKay, a tortricid systematist and collector of the first known specimens of the species.

References

Moths described in 2012
Sparganothini
Moths of North America